This section of the Timeline of United States history concerns events from 1930 to 1949.

1930s

Presidency of Herbert C. Hoover

1930 – The Great Depression in the United States continues to worsen, reaching a nadir in early 1933.
1930 – The Motion Picture Production Code becomes set of industry censorship guidelines governing production of the vast majority of United States motion pictures released by major studios; is effective for 38 years
1930 – Frozen vegetables, packaged by Clarence Birdseye, become the first frozen food to go on sale
1930 – The Democrats take Congress in the Midterms. Will keep it until 1946. 
1930 - Hawley-Smoot Tariff 
1930 - Clyde Tombaugh discovered Pluto 
1930 - Sinclair Lewis is the first American to win Nobel Prize for Literature 
1931 – Empire State Building opens in New York.
1931 – Japanese invasion of Manchuria, start of World War II in the Pacific. 
1931 – The Whitney Museum of American Art opens to the public in New York City.
1931 - “The Star-Spangled Banner” becomes official U.S. national anthem
1931 - Hoover vetoes Veteran Bonus
1931 - Pearl Buck publishes The Good Earth making heroes of the Chinese peasants
1932 – Stimson Doctrine opposes Japanese expansion into Manchuria
1932 – Norris-La Guardia Act strenthens labor unions
1932 - Baby son of Charles Lindbergh was kidnapped and found dead
1932 – Bonus Army marches on DC; repressed by President Hoover 
1932 – Reconstruction Finance Corporation finances relief
1932 – U.S. presidential election, 1932: Franklin D. Roosevelt elected president, John N. Garner elected vice president
1933 – Chicago Mayor Anton Cermak killed during a failed assassination attempt on President-elect Roosevelt.
1933 - Over 12 million or 25% of Americans were unemployed
1933 – 20th Amendment, establishing the beginning and ending of the terms of the elected federal offices.

Presidency of Franklin D. Roosevelt
1933 – Roosevelt becomes the 32nd President. He is the last president to be inaugurated on March 4. It also began his "Hundred Days"
1933 – President Roosevelt establishes the New Deal, a response to the Great Depression, and focusing on what historians call the "3 Rs": relief, recovery and reform
1933 - Emergency Banking Act
1933 – Sweeping new programs proposed under President Roosevelt take effect: the Agricultural Adjustment Act, Civil Works Administration, Civilian Conservation Corps, Farm Credit Administration the Home Owners Loan Corporation, the Tennessee Valley Authority, the Public Works Administration, the National Industrial Recovery Act
1933 - San Francisco Ballet founded
1933 – Giuseppe Zangara assassinates Chicago mayor Anton Cermak; the intended target was President-elect Roosevelt, who was not wounded.
1933 – Frances Perkins appointed United States Secretary of Labor
1933 – 21st Amendment, ending Prohibition
1933 - United States government recognizes the Soviet Union
1934 – Glass–Steagall Act
1934 – U.S. Securities and Exchange Commission established
1934 – Dust Bowl begins, causing major ecological and agricultural damage to the Great Plains states; severe drought, heat waves and other factors were contributors.
1934 – Federal Housing Administration
1934 – Johnson Act
1934 - Indian Reorganization Act
1934 – Philippine Commonwealth established
1934 – Reciprocal Trade Agreements Act
1934 – Tydings–McDuffie Act
1934 – John Dillinger killed
1934 – Indian Reorganization Act
1934 – Share the Wealth society founded by Huey Long
1934 - The first federal prisoners arrived at Alcatraz
1935 – Works Progress Administration
1935 – The F.B.I. is established with J. Edgar Hoover as its first director.
1935 – Neutrality Act
1935 – Motor Carrier Act
1935 – Social Security Act
1935 – Schechter Poultry Corp. v. United States
1935 – National Labor Relations Act
1935 – Huey Long assassinated
1935 – Congress of Industrial Organizations formed
1935 – Alcoholics Anonymous founded
1935 – Revenue Act of 1935
1935 - Middletown is published
1936 – Robinson-Patman Act
1936 - Hoover Dam
1936 – Life magazine publishes first issue
1936 – United States v. Butler, which ruled that the processing taxes instituted under the 1933 Agricultural Adjustment Act were unconstitutional
1936 – Second London Naval Treaty
1936 - Jesse Owens won 4 gold medals at the Olympics in Berlin, Germany
1936 – U.S. presidential election, 1936: Franklin D. Roosevelt reelected president, John N. Garner reelected vice president
1936 - 1936 Tupelo–Gainesville tornado outbreak
1936 - Babe Ruth and Ty Cobb named to baseball’s Hall of Fame
1937 – Look magazine publishes first issue
1937 – Neutrality Acts
1937 – President Roosevelt and Vice President Garner begin second terms and attempt to pack the Supreme Court
1937 – Hindenburg disaster, killing 35 people and marking an end to airship travel
1937 – Panay incident, a Japanese attack on the United States Navy gunboat  while anchored in the Yangtze River outside of Nanjing
1937 – Golden Gate Bridge completed in San Francisco
1938 – Wheeler-Lea Act
1938 – Fair Labor Standards Act
1938 - Thornton Wilder’s play Our Town wins Pulitzer Prize
1938 - The comic book superhero Superman debuts in Action Comics #1 (June 1938)
1938 – Orson Welles' The War of the Worlds broadcast
1939 – Hatch Act, aimed at corrupt political practices and prevented federal civil servants from campaigning
1939 – Nazi Germany invades Poland; World War II begins
1939 – Cash and carry proposed to replace the Neutrality Acts
1939 – President Roosevelt, appearing at the opening of the 1939 New York World's Fair, becomes the first President to give a speech that is broadcast on television. Semi-regular broadcasts air during the next two years

1940s

1940 – Selective Service Act, establishing the first peacetime draft in U.S. history
1940 – Alien Registration (Smith) Act
1940 – Oldsmobile becomes the first car maker to offer a fully automatic transmission
1940 – Bugs Bunny, Tom and Jerry and Woody Woodpecker make their cartoon debuts
1940 – Billboard magazine publishes its first music popularity chart, the predecessor to today's Hot 100
1940 – U.S. presidential election, 1940: Franklin D. Roosevelt is reelected president to a record third term, Henry A. Wallace is elected vice president
1940 - Color television is demonstrated by the Columbia Broadcasting System
1941 – Regular commercial television broadcasting begins; CBS and NBC television networks launched.
1941 – President Roosevelt begins third term; Wallace becomes Vice President
1941 – Lend-Lease, which supplies the United Kingdom, the Soviet Union, China, France and other Allied nations with vast amounts of war material during World War II
1941 – Operation Barbarossa
1941 – Attack on Pearl Harbor; U.S. enters World War II by declaring war on Japan the next day on December 8; and three days later against Germany and Italy.
1941 – Atlantic Charter, drafted by the UK and U.S., to serve as the blueprint for the postwar world after World War II
1942 – Japanese American internment begins, per executive order by President Roosevelt; the order also authorizes the seizure of their property.
1942–1945 – Automobile production in the United States for private consumers halted.
1942 – Casablanca released
1942 - Sugar and gasoline are rationed
1942 – Office of Price Administration
1942 – Cocoanut Grove fire kills 492 people, leads to vast reforms in fire codes and safety standards
1942 – Congress of Racial Equality
1942 – Revenue Act of 1942
1942 – Doolittle Raid
1942 – Battle of the Coral Sea
1942 – Battle of Midway
1942 – Guadalcanal Campaign
1942 – Operation Torch
1942 – U.S.-controlled Commonwealth of the Philippines conquered by Japanese forces
1943 – Office of Price Administration established
1943 – Oklahoma! the first musical written by the team of composer Richard Rodgers and librettist Oscar Hammerstein II opens on Broadway
1943 – Detroit, Michigan race riots
1943 – Allied invasion of Sicily
1943 – Allied invasion of Italy
1943 – Cairo Conference
1943 – Casablanca Conference
1943 – Tehran Conference (meeting between the leaders of USSR, UK, and US to discuss D-day)
1944 – Battle of Monte Cassino
1944 – Dumbarton Oaks Conference
1944 – G.I. Bill
1944 – D-Day (also known as Operation Overlord)
1944 – Bretton Woods Conference
1944 – Battle of Peleliu
1944 – Battle of Leyte
1944 – Battle of the Bulge
1944 – U.S. presidential election, 1944: Franklin D. Roosevelt reelection for a fourth term, becomes the only U.S. president elected four times. Harry S. Truman is elected vice president
1945 – President Roosevelt begins fourth term; Truman becomes Vice President
1945 – Yalta Conference
1945 – Battle of Iwo Jima
1945 – Battle of Okinawa
1945 – Nationwide labor strikes due to inflation; OPA disbanded

Presidency of Harry S. Truman
1945 – President Roosevelt dies, Vice President Truman becomes the 33rd President
April 12, 1945 - Vice president Truman takes over after being Roosevelt's VP for only 88 days.
1945 – Germany surrenders, end of World War II in Europe
1945 – Carousel opens on Broadway 
1945 – Potsdam Conference
1945 - Tennessee Williams’s play The Glass Menagerie opens in New York
1945 – Atomic bombs dropped on Hiroshima and Nagasaki. Days later, Japan surrenders, ending World War II
1945 – United Nations Conference on International Organization; United Nations established
1945 – United Nations Charter signed in San Francisco, establishing the United Nations; it replaces the League of Nations
1945–1949 – Nuremberg Trials and Subsequent Nuremberg Trials
1946 – Winston Churchill's Iron Curtain speech
1946 – Benjamin Spock's The Common Sense Book of Baby and Child Care published
1946 – Employment Act
1946 – United States Atomic Energy Act of 1946
1946 – President's Committee on Civil Rights
1946 – Philippines regain independence from the U.S.
1946 – Republicans take control of Congress for the first time in 16 years.
1947 – Presidential Succession Act
1947 – Taft Hartley Act
1947 – U.F.O. crash at Roswell, New Mexico
1947 – National Security Act of 1947
1947 – General Agreement on Tariffs and Trade
1947 – The Marshall Plan
1947 – Polaroid camera invented
1947 – Truman Doctrine establishes "the policy of the United States to support free peoples who are resisting attempted subjugation by armed minorities or by outside pressures"
1947 – Federal Employee Loyalty Program
1947 – Jackie Robinson breaks color barrier in baseball
1947 – Studebaker becomes the first automobile manufacturer to introduce a "post-war" model; most automakers wait until 1948 or 1949
1947 – Jackson Pollock begins painting his most famous series of paintings called the drip paintings in Easthampton, New York
1947 – First broadcast of Meet the Press
1947 - World Series is broadcast live on television for the first time
1948 – The Texaco Star Theater, starring Milton Berle, becomes the first major successful U.S. television program; The Toast of the Town also debuts
1948 – Berlin Blockade
1948 – U.S. presidential election, 1948: Harry S. Truman is elected president for a full term, Alben W. Barkley is elected vice president
1948 – Truman desegregates armed forces
1948 – Selective Service Act of 1948: Passed after first such act expired
1948 – Organization of American States: Alliance of North America and South America
1948 – Alger Hiss Case
1949 – President Truman begins full term, Barkley becomes Vice President
1949 – North Atlantic Treaty Organization (NATO) formed
1949 – In China, Communists under Mao Zedong force Chiang Kai-shek's KMT government to retreat to Taiwan
1949 – Soviet Union tests its first atomic bomb
1949 – Department of War becomes the Department of the Army and becomes subordinate to the new Department of Defense
1949 – Germany divided into East and West
1949 – Truman attempts to continue FDR's legacy with his Fair Deal, but most acts don't pass

References

 Kutler, Stanley L., ed. Encyclopedia of the United States in the Twentieth Century (4 vol, 1996) 
 Morris, Richard, ed. Encyclopedia of American History (7th ed. 1996) online 
 Schlesinger, Jr., Arthur M. The Almanac of American History (1983)

See also
 Causes of the Great Depression
 Timeline of modern American conservatism
 History of the United States (1918–1945)
 History of the United States (1945–1964)

1930